Prenylated flavin mononucleotide (prFMN) is a cofactor biosynthesized by the flavin prenyltransferase UbiX and used by UbiD enzymes for reversible decarboxylation reactions.  Hence, prFMN is pivotal for catalysis in the ubiquitous microbial UbiD/X system.

prFMN is flavin prenylated at the N5 and C6 positions resulting in the formation of a fourth non-aromatic ring. 

prFMN was discovered in 2015 at the University of Manchester by David Leys' group.

Two studies in 2015 characterized UbiX as a flavin prenyltransferase, supplying prFMN to UbiD/Fdc1 which utilises the cofactor to catalyse a reversible decarboxylation reaction. Ferulic acid decarboxylase (Fdc1) from A. niger co-expressed in E.coli with UbiX from E.coli (AnFdc1UbiX) once purified had clear spectral differences to singly expressed AnFdc1, and was capable of in vitro decarboxylation of a range of aromatic carboxylic acids. The atomic resolution of the crystal structure of AnFdc1UbiX, allowed elucidation of the structure of the modified FMN cofactor classified as prFMN. The crystal structure revealed an isopentenyl-adduct to the N5-C6 of FMN, with the modifications branched nature and the position of the covalent linkages with flavin suggesting prenylation.

PrFMNOx 

UbiD activation by UbiX/prFMN was found to be dependent on oxygen suggesting that the reduced prFMN product of UbiX is oxidised to the catalytically relevant form. Several variations of the oxidised prFMN (prFMNox) cofactor were observed: prFMNiminium, hydroxylated prFMNiminium and prFMNketimine. Determination of the prFMN isomer that was catalytically relevant involved incubation of AnFdc1UbiX with phenylpyruvate (of which a small proportion is α-hydroxycinnamic acid which closely resembles cinnamic acid - a model substrate). Incubation with phenylpyruvate lead to an altered UV-Vis spectrum and reversible enzyme inhibition. The crystal structure of AnFdc1UbiX with phenylpyruvate revealed a bond between C1’ of prFMNiminium and a phenylacetaldehyde adduct – a species that can be formed by decarboxylation of α-hydroxycinnamic acid and tautomerization of the α-hydroxystyrene prFMNiminium adduct.

This observation confirmed that it is the prFMNiminium that is the catalytically relevant cofactor.

References 

Cofactors
Flavins
Heterocyclic compounds with 4 rings
Organophosphates